Little Mexican (titled Young Archimedes in the U.S.) (1924), Aldous Huxley's third collection of short fiction, consists of the following six short stories:

"Uncle Spencer"
"Little Mexican"
"Hubert and Minnie"
"Fard"
"The Portrait"
"Young Archimedes"

"Young Archimedes" was adapted into a film, Prelude to Fame in 1950 and an Italian film, Il piccolo Archimede, in 1979.

External links

 The full text of Little Mexican at the Internet Archive

1924 short story collections
Short story collections by Aldous Huxley
Chatto & Windus books